Hugh Kestell Cornish  (born 6 February 1934) is a former Australian television personality, best known as being the first person to appear on television in Queensland in 1959.

Career
Cornish's media career began in radio at 4IP in Ipswich, before he was subsequently hired by Brisbane radio station 4BH as a piano player.

When television arrived in Queensland, Cornish was the first person to appear when Brisbane's Channel 9 launched in 1959, beginning a long association with the station where as well as being an on air presenter, he also served as the station's program manager, assistant general manager, and general manager.

In the early 1960s, Cornish hosted Channel 9's local variety show Brisbane Tonight and from 1978 until 1983, he also hosted the station's local talent show Stairway to the Stars.

Cornish produced a Royal Command Performance at Her Majesty's Theatre in Brisbane in 1982 as part of the Commonwealth Games, which Cornish has often described as the highlight of his career.

After leaving Channel 9 in 1985, Cornish moved to Channel 7 where he worked as a corporate development manager for several years before taking up the position as the director of children's television for the Australian Television Network or the Seven Network.  In 1989, Cornish briefly returned to Queensland television screens as the weekend newsreader for Channel 10 in Brisbane.  Cornish was then employed as a manager of corporate development at the Queensland Arts Council from 1993 until 2000, and a development manager for the Queensland Orchestra from 2000 until 2001.

Despite his long association with the station, Cornish criticised Channel Nine Brisbane in 2011 following the infamous Choppergate controversy when the station was caught out staging fake live crosses. Cornish said he believed the station's reputation had been "sullied and damaged" by the scandal and that it would take time for Channel 9 to regain its credibility. However, within three years, Nine News Queensland would regain the lead in the local ratings.

When analogue television signals were switched off in Brisbane on 28 May 2013, Cornish was invited back to Channel 9 to be granted the honour of switching off the station's analogue transmission signal.  He said the experience had left him "a bit teary". Cornish was the first and last person to control Channel 9 Brisbane’s analogue signal.

Cornish is credited with helping raise millions of dollars for charity including raising $9 million from various telethons and benefit concerts he produced.

Now in retirement, Cornish was a resident of the Renaissance Retirement Village at Victoria Point where he is credited with establishing an entertainment program.  He and the other residents at the facility published a nude calendar in 2013 featuring semi-nude photos of themselves to raise money for charity, Look Good Feel Better. Hugh is now a resident at the Portofino Aged Care Home at Hamilton.

Honours
Cornish was a recipient of the Centenary Medal in 2001.

In 2004, Cornish was named as a Queensland Great.

In 2014, he was named as a finalist in the Senior Australian of the Year category at the Australian of the Year Awards.

References 

1934 births
Living people
Australian television personalities